Sandro Casamonica (born December 3, 1969, in Rome) is a professional boxer from Italy, who won the bronze medal in the featherweight division at the 1989 European Amateur Boxing Championships in Athens, Greece. Nicknamed Zorba, he made his professional debut in 1992.

Casamonica won the WBO Inter-Continental Lightweight Title on December 17, 1999, by defeating Victor Baute of Spain. A year later he captured the WBA International Lightweight Title after knocking down Hungary's Zoltan Kalocsai. He was stripped of the title on February 18, 2002, due to his failure to defend his belt against Miguel Callist.

References
 

1969 births
Living people
Featherweight boxers
Boxers from Rome
Italian male boxers